The Captain Robert Dexter Conrad Award is an award presented annually to the individual making an outstanding contribution in naval research and development.

Background
The award is named in honor of Captain Robert Dexter Conrad, who was the primary architect of the Navy’s basic research program, and the head of the Planning Division of the Office of Naval Research at the time of its establishment. It is designed to recognize and to reward outstanding technical and scientific achievement in research and development for the Department of the Navy (DON).

Description
The Captain Robert Dexter Conrad award consists of a gold medal and a citation signed by the Secretary of the Navy.

Criteria
The Captain Robert Dexter Conrad award will be granted, on an annual basis, to an individual who has made an outstanding contribution in the field of research and development for the DON. Such contribution shall be so outstanding as to be widely recognized, not only by the cognizant personnel within the DON, but also by the civilian scientific and engineering community of the Nation. While no time limitation is intended to be imposed in selecting a candidate for the award, it is recommended that only accomplishments of recent years be considered. Award considerations will be given to achievements in any of the following:

 Planning and administration of scientific research and development.
 Individual achievement or series of achievements which contribute to the progress of science or technology in fields of significance to the Department of the Navy.

Eligibility
At the time of the achievement or contribution cited as a basis for the award, nominees must have been in one of the following categories:

 a civilian employee in an active employment status in the Department of Navy
 an employee of a Department of Navy contractor
 a member of the military service on active duty.

Nominating responsibilities
The Chief of Naval Research (CNR) is responsible for obtaining and forwarding, with comments, a nomination to the Secretary of the Navy via the Assistant Secretary of the Navy (Research, Engineering and System) annually.

If none of the nominees submitted in a given year meet the established standards, the CNR will recommend to the Secretary that no award be granted for that year. To avoid possible embarrassment, nominations should be designated “FOR OFFICIAL USE ONLY” and safeguarded until final action has been taken.

Nomination procedure
The Chief of Naval Research will establish a Nomination Review Committee. The Committee will consist of nine representatives from Navy activities, which have significant research and development programs. The Committee will be responsible for ensuring that the widest possible consideration of potential nominees and for making an appropriate recommendation to the CNR.

Award nominations should be in the correct format and be favorably endorsed by the headquarters command. The CNR will issue a notice concerning the nomination due date and general information on the Committee meeting. Prior to this meeting, Committee members will receive a copy of each nomination to be considered.

When the Committee meets, each representative should be prepared to provide supporting information on the potential candidate(s) submitted by his or her organization. After each nomination has been discussed, ballots will be completed and a recommendation will be formulated and forwarded to the CNR.

Award presentation
Awards approved by the Secretary of the Navy will be presented by the CNR or the CNR’s designated representative at a special ceremony which is mutually convenient to the recipient, his or her employing organization, and the CNR.

Recipients 
List of recipients and year supplied by the Office of Naval Research; affiliation gleaned from a web search.

 1957 Dr. Alan T. Waterman, Office of Naval Research
 1958 Dr. Charles Christian Lauritsen, California Institute of Technology
 1959 Dr. Robert M. Page, Naval Research Laboratory
 1960 Dr. Ralph E. Gibson, Johns Hopkins University Applied Physics Laboratory
 1961 Dr. Howard T. Karsner,	Bureau of Medicine and Surgery
 1962 VADM John T. Hayward, United States Navy
 1963 Dr. Gerald M. Clemence, Naval Observatory
 1964 Dr. Herbert Friedman, Naval Research Laboratory
 1965 CAPT Ashton Graybiel, Navy School of Aviation Medicine Pensacola
 1966 VADM Levering Smith, United States Navy
 1967 Professor William Markowitz, Marquette University
 1968 Dr. William A. Zisman, Naval Research Laboratory
 1969 Dr. George R. Irwin, Naval Research Laboratory
 1970 Mr. Haskell G. Wilson, Naval Weapons Center China Lake
 1971 Dr. Harry Hoogstraal, Naval Medical Research Unit No 3 Cairo Egypt
 1972 Mr. Howard O. Lorenzen, Naval Research Laboratory
 1973 Mr. William S. Pellini, Naval Research Laboratory
 1974 Dr. Fred N. Spiess, Scripps Institution of Oceanography
 1975 Mr. John A. Pierce, Harvard University
 1976 Dr. Jerome Karle, Naval Research Laboratory
 1977 CAPT Charles E. Brodine, Navy Medical Research and Development Command
 1978 Dr. Walter H. Munk, Scripps Institution of Oceanography
 1979 Dr. Harold E. Bennett, Naval Weapons Center China Lake
 1980 Dr. Isabella L. Karle, Naval Research Laboratory
 1981 Dr. Victor L. Granatstein, Naval Research Laboratory
 1982 Dr. Alan Berman, Naval Research Laboratory
 1983 Dr. Alan Powell, Naval Surface Warfare Center Carderock
 1984 Dr. Thomas G. Giallorenzi, Naval Research Laboratory
 1985 Mr. Larry J. Argiro, Naval Surface Warfare Center Annapolis
 1986 Mr. Peter G. Wilhelm, Naval Research Laboratory
 1987 Dr. C. Robert Valeri, Navy Blood Research Laboratory Plymouth
 1988 Dr. Fred E. Saalfeld, Naval Research Laboratory and Office of Naval Research
 1989 Dr. Jay Paul Boris, Naval Research Laboratory
 1990 Dr. Homer W. Carhart, Naval Research Laboratory
 1991 Dr. Robert D. Ballard, Woods Hole Oceanographic Institute
 1992 Dr. William B. Morgan, Naval Surface Warfare Center Carderock
 1993 Dr. Carver A. Mead, California Institute of Technology
 1994 Dr. Carl O. Bostrom, Johns Hopkins University Applied Physics Laboratory
 1995 Dr. Maurice M. Sevik, Naval Surface Warfare Center Carderock
 1996 Dr. Carl H. June, Uniformed Services University of Health Sciences Bethesda
 1997 Dr. Norman L. Owsley, Naval Undersea Warfare Center Newport
 1998 CAPT Stephen L. Hoffman, Navy Medical Research Center Forest Glen
 1998 Dr. Ming Chiang Lin, Naval Research Laboratory
 1999 Dr. Timothy P. Coffey, Naval Research Laboratory
 2005 Dr. Rolf G. Kasper, Naval Undersea Warfare Center Newport
 2007 Dr. Baruch Levush, Naval Research Laboratory
 2008 Dr. Josko Catipovic, Naval Undersea Warfare Center Newport
 2009 Dr. Robert M. Koch, Naval Undersea Warfare Center Newport
 2010 Dr. Ted R. Clem, Naval Surface Warfare Center Panama City
 2011 Mr. Keith Lucas, Naval Research Laboratory
 2012 Dr. Kazhikathra Kailasanath, Naval Research Laboratory
 2014 Dr. Wallace Arden Smith, Office of Naval Research
 2015 Dr. Jerry Meyer, Naval Research Laboratory
 2016 Dr. Thomas L. Reinecke, Naval Research Laboratory

References
 SECNAVINST 5061.9G

Awards and decorations of the United States Navy